The Women's National Basketball Association (WNBA) All-Star Game is an annual exhibition basketball game played between the Eastern Conference and the Western Conference All-Stars. Eleven players, five starters and six reserves, from each conference are chosen. The starters are chosen through electronic ballots cast daily by fans on WNBA.com. The leading vote recipients at each position start the game. The reserves are chosen by voting among the league's head coaches. Coaches are not allowed to vote for their own players. Through the 2013 game, coaches could select two guards, two forwards, one center and two players regardless of positions. Starting with the 2014 game, the forward and center positions were folded into a single frontcourt category; coaches can now vote for two guards, three frontcourt players, and one player regardless of position. If a player is unable to participate due to injury or illness, a replacement will be selected.

In five seasons, there was no All-Star Game:
 In 2004, The Game at Radio City was held between the WNBA All-Stars and the USA national team due to the 2004 Summer Olympics.
 The 2008 All-Star Game was not held due to the 2008 Summer Olympics.
 In 2010, the Stars at the Sun game was also held between a team of WNBA stars and the USA national team, even though it was a non-Olympic year and the season did not directly conflict with the year's main international women's basketball event, the 2010 FIBA World Championship for Women.
 The 2012 All-Star Game was not held due to the 2012 Summer Olympics.
 The 2016 All-Star Game was not held due to the 2016 Summer Olympics.

The following is a list of WNBA All-Stars, players who have been selected for the WNBA All-Star Game at least once in their career. Note that the number indicates the player's number of selections, not the number of games played. Tamika Catchings hold the record for most All-Star Game selections with 10. Catchings has sole possession of the record for most All-Star Games played, with 9. Sue Bird has the most selections as a starter with 7. As of the 2019 WNBA season, 135 players have been selected.

Note: Statistics are correct as July 2, 2021.

Notes
 Denotes a player who is a United States citizen but is naturalized and represents a different country internationally.

References